Umu-Nneochi or Umunneochi is a Local Government Area (LGA) in Abia State, Nigeria.

Officially known as "Nneochi", Umunneochi is made up of three major septs: Umuchieze, Nneato, and Isuochi. The major towns of Umunneochi are Umuelem, Ndiawa, Amuda, Ngodo-ukwu, Lokpaukwu, Leru, Lomara Lokpanta, Lekwesi and Mbala . These towns have been repeatedly reorganized. The paramount traditional ruler of isuochi is  Eze G I Ezekwesiri, the Ochi 1 of Isuochi, while the federating autonomous communities are governored by  Ndi-Eze.

Umunneochi headquarters is in the administrative town of Nkwoagu, Isuochi. Nkwoagu is also the administrative capital, which in ancient and modern times were political and administrative rallying points for the Umunneochi autonomous communities.

Umunneochi occupies 368 km with a population of 163,928, according to the 2006 Nigeria National Census.

Economy 
The major occupations include agriculture and granite, quorite, and laterite mining and trading. The main agricultural food crops are cassava, yam, black beans, and cocoyam. The cash crops are palm nuts and cashew nuts. Pottery is another occupation. Nigeria's biggest cattle market is in the lokpanta area.

Infrastructure 
Public and private schools and churches are present.

See also
List of villages in Abia State

References

Local Government Areas in Abia State